Gorringe is a rare English-language surname and may refer to:

Allan Gorringe (1884–1918), English cricketer
Daniel Gorringe (born 1992), Australian rules footballer
Frank Gorringe (born 1889), Royal Air Force officer
G. F. Gorringe (1868–1945), British Army officer
Harry Gorringe (born 1928), Australian cricketer
Henry Honychurch Gorringe (1841–1885), U.S. Navy officer
Horrie Gorringe (1895–1994), Australian rules footballer
Hubert Gorringe (1886–1958), English cricketer
Timothy Gorringe (born 1946), British theologian

See also
 Gorringe Ridge, a seamount in the Atlantic Ocean near Portugal